The Chimp (Kyrgyz: Maimil, Маймыл) is a 2001 Kyrgyz film directed by Aktan Abdykalykov. It was Kyrgyzstan's submission to the 74th Academy Awards for the Academy Award for Best Foreign Language Film, but was not accepted as a nominee. It was also screened in the Un Certain Regard section at the 2001 Cannes Film Festival.

Cast
 Mirlan Abdykalykov - The Chimp
 Dzylykcy Dzakypov - The father
 Sergej Golovkin - Sacha
 Alexandra Mitrokhina - Zina
 Yuri Sokolov - Iouri
 Salynbek Sarymsakov - Akbar
 Alexei Manzinbine - Friend of the father
 Tchynarkoul Moukacheva - Woman with the skin stain
 Jyldyz Abakirova - Jyldyz
 Veronika Semibratova - Vicki
 Renata Tanabaeva - Renata
 Nelli Soultangazieva - Nelli
 Saida Mamyrbaeva - Saida
 Nikolai Bouriak - Head worker
 Ainagoul Essenkojeva - The Mother

See also
 List of submissions to the 74th Academy Awards for Best Foreign Language Film

References

External links
 

2001 films
2001 drama films
Kyrgyzstani drama films
French drama films
Japanese drama films
Kyrgyz-language films
2000s Russian-language films
Films directed by Aktan Abdykalykov
2000s Japanese films
2000s French films